The 2020 AFC U-19 Championship would have been the 41st edition of the biennial international youth football championship organised by the Asian Football Confederation (AFC) for the men's under-19 national teams of Asia. It was scheduled to take place in Uzbekistan, who had been appointed as the host by the AFC on 17 September 2019. It was originally scheduled to run between 14 and 31 October 2020, but was postponed twice due to the COVID-19 pandemic.

The AFC announced the cancellation of the tournament on 25 January 2021, leaving the hosting rights for the 2023 AFC U-20 Asian Cup with Uzbekistan.

Originally, the top four teams of the tournament would have qualified for the 2021 FIFA U-20 World Cup in Indonesia as the AFC representatives, plus Indonesia who qualified automatically as the World Cup hosts. Due to the ongoing COVID-19 Pandemic, the 2021 U-20 World Cup was also cancelled, with hosting rights for the 2023 FIFA U-20 World Cup still kept with Indonesia.

This edition was expected to be the last to be played as an under-19 tournament, as the AFC have proposed switching the tournament from under-19 to under-20 starting from 2023.

Saudi Arabia were the defending champions.

Qualification

Qualification matches were played in November 2019. Uzbekistan also participated in the qualifiers, even though they had already qualified automatically as hosts.

Qualified teams
The following 16 teams qualified for the final tournament.

Draw
The draw of the final tournament was held on 18 June 2020, 16:30 MYT (UTC+8), at the AFC House in Kuala Lumpur. The 16 teams were drawn into four groups of four teams, with the teams seeded according to their performance in the 2018 AFC U-19 Championship final tournament and qualification, with the hosts Uzbekistan automatically seeded and assigned to Position A1 in the draw.

Notes

References

External links
, the-AFC.com
AFC U-19 Championship 2020, stats.the-AFC.com

 
AFC U-19 Championship
2020 in Asian football
2020 in youth association football
2021 FIFA U-20 World Cup qualification
March 2021 sports events in Asia
2020 Afc U-19 Championship
Association football events cancelled due to the COVID-19 pandemic